Methyl eugenol (allylveratrol) is a natural chemical compound classified as a phenylpropene, a type of phenylpropanoid.  It is the methyl ether of eugenol and is important to insect behavior and pollination. It is found in various essential oils.

Methyl eugenol is found in a number of plants (over 450 species from 80 families including both angiosperm and gymnosperm families) and has a role in attracting pollinators. About 350 plant species have them as a component of floral fragrance. Their ability to attract insects, particularly Bactrocera fruit flies (particularly, Bactrocera dorsalis male flies) was first noticed in 1915 by F. M. Howlett. The compound may have evolved in response to pathogens, as methyl eugenol has some antifungal activity. It also repels many insects.

As of October 2018, the US FDA withdrew authorization for the use of methyl eugenol as a synthetic flavoring substance for use in food because petitioners (including the Natural Resources Defense Council, the Center for Food Safety, and the Center for Science in the Public Interest) provided data demonstrating that these additives induce cancer in laboratory animals. FDA noted the action was despite its continuing stance that this substance does not pose a risk to public health under the conditions of its intended use.

From 2021 any product that contains more than 0.01% of Methyl Eugenol has to be stated as per the CLP regulation (Regulation (EC) No 1272/2008)

See also 
 Methyl isoeugenol

References 

Phenylpropenes
Allyl compounds
IARC Group 2B carcinogens
O-methylated natural phenols